Georgiy Aleksandrovich Rubchinskiy (born 29 June 1984), known as Gosha Rubchinskiy, is a Russian fashion designer, photographer and the founder of his eponymous brand (ГОША РУБЧИНСКИЙ). Rubchinskiy takes inspiration from the fall of the Iron Curtain, Russian street and youth culture, and his experiences to create his collections, pushing Russian iconography, both past and present, onto the world stage through his runway shows and his imagery.

Early life
Rubchinskiy was born in Moscow in 1984, in Russian family, and later attended the Moscow College of Technology and Design. Rubchinskiy wanted to work in fashion at a young age, and in college began hairdressing and makeup, which put him in the fashion circles of Russia.

Brand
Referencing Ronald Reagan's Cold War-description of the USSR, Rubchinskiy's first collection, Empire of Evil was presented at the end of 2008 for SS/09. His second collection, Growing and Expanding, was shown in a disused Orthodox church-turned-gym in Moscow’s suburbs. Rubchinskiy's third collection, The sunrise is not far behind the mountains, consisted of three parts: a video shot in St. Petersburg, a book of photographs and the collection itself. In 2010, the designer presented his forth collection, Slave, as a part of Fashion East Menswear Installation. Rubchinskiy has been working with Comme des Garçons since 2012.

In the summer of 2011, Gosha launched the project Transfiguration in a gallery space attached to a photography workshop and skate-park on the island of New Holland in Saint Petersburg, Russia - area that had been closed to the public for the previous 300 years. The Transfiguration book, made with the help of publisher Junsuke Yamasaki and art director Pavel Milkyakov was published in 2012. It was followed by the film two years later that epitomised his brand identity: strong young men with vulnerable expressions wearing a uniform derived from 80s punk music and 90s skate culture. Making reference to Russia's orthodox past through glimpses of religious paintings, and a soundtrack ranging from Igor Stravinsky's Firebird suite to t.A.T.u., the film illuminates a country undergoing political, economic and cultural turmoil whilst proving that its maker belongs to a post-Soviet generation bent on creative change.

In August 2014, IDEA Books published Crimea/Kids, an 80-page photozine that explored Rubchinskiy's fascination with Russia's rebellious youth and their outlets through smoking, skateboarding and graffiti. For the next book Youth Hotel Rubchinskiy re-visits the Soviet themes he pursued in his recent 1984 collection, where he drew parallels between George Orwell's fictional totalitarian surveillance society and that of his homeland today. 

For his SS17 show staged at Pitti Uomo, Gosha Rubchinskiy presented a collection in three parts – a runway show, a film, and a series of photos, both entitled The Day of My Death, exhibited at the fair and later published as a book by IDEA. Florence's Manifattura Tabacchi provided the backdrop for them all; an abandoned factory built in the 1930s by the State's Fascist regime, which bears a striking resemblance to Soviet architecture. In this show Rubchinskiy also partnered with the Italian sportswear brand Fila, with FILA x Gosha Rubchinskiy showing sweatshirts featuring the brand and custom sneakers with Cyrillic script.

In 2016, the creative multi-hyphenate released a fragrance, along with a new photography book to accompany it - titled Perfume Book – which featured one of Rubchinskiy's shaven-headed muses shot in Spain. The same year Gosha launched new label PACCBET, together with Tolia Titaev, a professional skater and muse to the designer. The name, which has already appeared as a slogan in some of Rubchinskiy's designs, is also a symbol of the new emerging generation of Russian skaters.

Following the announcement of Gosha Rubchisnkiy's long-term collaboration with Adidas Football leading up to the 2018 World Cup, the designer chose the city of Kaliningrad for his first show in Russia since 2009. The football-inspired A/W 17 collection was presented at the Regional Center of Youth Culture, which currently occupies the building of the Königsberg Stock Exchange. His open casting call was answered by young men from all over the country. A documentary Apart, presented by a Moscow-based publishing and online platform INRUSSIA, stars three young men who travelled from across Russia to take a part in the show in the country's westernmost exclave. Directed by Papaya Dog, the film is a poetic and beautiful testament to the lives of Gosha's post-Soviet youth, told without hyperbole or drama. Kaliningrad guidebook and travel zine, featuring enigmatic, black-and-white photography by Kirill Gluschenko, shines light on the unique historical convergence of German and Soviet architecture of the city and aims to guide visitors through Kaliningrad in a friendly fashion. The zine was presented at the show in January 2017 and launched Gosha's collaboration with INRUSSIA's publishing program.

During the presentation of his 2018 S/S collection in St. Petersburg, Gosha Rubchinskiy revealed his collaboration with Burberry. The collection, inspired by football and Russian rave aesthetics, is essentially a love letter to that ’90s scene. It was followed by the release of a limited-run zine  offering an intimate look into the underground cultural revolution birthed from the ashes of Soviet Russia in the late ’80s and early ’90s. Giving more context to the collection and its inspiration, Saint Petersburg zine serves as a contextual guide through Russia’s underground rave culture, featuring photos captured in such iconic night clubs as Tunnel and Planetarium, as well as exclusive interviews with the movement’s key figures.

In February 2017, the Rubchinskiy-backed brand and skate team PACCBET traveled to Southern California to meet with American skaters Dolan Stearn, Julian Klincewicz, and their crew. During the road trip, they collided their respective worlds into a short documentary, weaving through California’s concrete and rubble surface. The film was presented along with the second collection by РАССВЕТ at the Trading Museum in Paris in June 2017. A zine titled "Goodbye America" and the brand's lookbook completed the three-part project.

In April 2018, Rubchinskiy announced on Instagram that the self titled brand would be ending "as you've known it." He stated that the brand would no longer create seasonal collections and that "something new" was coming. In a talk translated by Vogue Rubchinskiy commented, "Every idea has a time and what I wanted to express, I expressed it. I believe that in the state that [Gosha Rubchinskiy] exists, it is a good condition to end this history and start a new one." There has yet to be news as to how the brand will change, while some believe Rubchinskiy will use this freedom to work on independent projects within the brand such as his photography, which the designer already integrated into the brand.

Other projects 
In 2020 Rubchinskiy's brand PACCBET collaborated with the Pushkin State Museum of Fine Arts and created a series of items inspired by masterpieces of Japanese Edo paintings and prints.

On October 1, 2021, Rubchinskiy presented his collaboration with Russian actress Renata Litvinova. An exhibition of his photography under the name 'Northern Wind’ was presented in Moscow Triumph gallery. Rubchinsky also worked as stylist and decorator of Litvinova's theatrical piece of the same name, staged in 2017. The series of photographs further immersed the audience into the ‘dark and gloomy’ world of the ‘Northern Wind’ story.

Influence 
The success of Rubchinsky and Demna Gvasalia of Vetements brought huge attention to so-called "Post-Soviet" aesthetics. The trend wasn't limited to major chain stores such as Urban Outfitters and Topman that started selling garment with Cyrillic slogans, but also led to a renaissance in clothing design in Russia and Ukraine. The list of brands that contributed to the Post-Soviet streetwear trend included Sputnik 1985, Volchok, Mech, LECHARLATAN, R-SSA, Podmost, Syndicate, Otocyon, Artem Shumov, Anastasia Dokuchaeva, Yasya Minochkina, Turbo Yulia, Alexandr Rogov and many others.

Controversies 
In December 2018, it was alleged by a 16-year-old boy that Rubchinskiy pressured him into sending explicit photographs of himself. The boy included screenshots as evidence. Shortly thereafter, another man claimed that Rubchinskiy also requested explicit photographs. Rubchinskiy denied the accusations.

See also 
Dover Street Market
Anti Social Social Club
Billionaire Boys Club
Virgil Abloh
OVO
Balenciaga
Vetements
Highsnobiety
 Raf Simons
 Demna Gvasalia

References

External links
Apart, Gosha Rubchinskiy documentary
Gosha Rubchinskiy at Vogue

Living people
1984 births
Photographers from Moscow
Street fashion
Russian fashion designers
Clothing brands of Russia
Businesspeople from Moscow